PIK3CA-related overgrowth spectrum (PROS) is an umbrella term for rare syndromes characterized by malformations and tissue overgrowth caused by somatic mutations in PIK3CA gene. In PROS diseases individuals malformations are seen in several different tissues such as skin, vasculature, bones, fat and brain tissue depending on the specific disease.


PROS spectrum diseases
PROS spectrum diseases include:
 Fibro-adipose vascular anomaly
 Hemihyperplasia–multiple lipomatosis syndrome
 CLOVES syndrome
 Macrodactyly
 Facial infiltrating lipomatosis
 Macrocephaly-capillary malformation
 Dysplastic megalencephaly
 Klippel–Trénaunay syndrome

Pathophysiology 
PIK3CA gene codes for p110α protein which is a catalytic subunit of phosphoinositide 3-kinase, a major regulator of several important cellular functions such as cell proliferation, growth and apoptosis. Mutations in PIK3CA cause over-activity of PI3K which in turn leads to altered growth of cells and tissues which is thought to be important for overgrowth and malformations in PROS. Different presentations of PROS diseases are likely explained by acquisition of the mutation in different time points and different cell types during embryonic development

Treatment 
Treatment of PROS diseases is variable and depends on the specific disease. Curative treatment does not exist and most treatments are given to control symptoms. Overgrowth and malformations of solid tissues can be treated with surgery. Sclerotherapy can be used to treat vascular malformations. In CLOVES syndrome experimental medical therapy using PIK3CA inhibitor, BYL719, has been reported to be effective to relieve pain and diminish the malformations.

References 

Rare syndromes